The Cauvery North Wildlife Sanctuary is a protected area located in the Dharmapuri and Krishnagiri districts of Tamil Nadu, India. Sanctuary is named as it is located above the north of Cauvery river in Tamil Nadu state and south of river connects to the Cauvery Wildlife Sanctuary of Karnataka state. On 12 March 2014, the Government of Tamil Nadu declared Cauvery North Wild Life Sanctuary under clause (b) of sub-section (1) of Section 26-A of the Wild Life (Protection) Act, 1972 in Gazette No.II(2)/EF/254/2014.

Sanctuary comes under the Melagiri Hill ranges which is a significant wildlife corridor in the confluence of Eastern Ghats and Western Ghats where it forms the vital link to the MM Hills, BR Hills, Sathyamangalam Wildlife Sanctuary and Nilgiri Biosphere Reserve. The sanctuary covers parts Palacode taluk of Dharmapuri forest division and Denkanikottai taluk of Hosur forest division in northern western Tamil Nadu.

References 

 Tamil Nadu Government Gazette published the notice on 12 March 2014 for the formation of Cauvery North Wild Life Sanctuary in Hosur and Dharmapuri Forest Divisions under Wild Life Protection Act under Gazette issue number : 10  of Part II—Section 2 ENVIRONMENT AND FOREST DEPARTMENT - Wild Life Protection Act. Retrieved on 27 May 2017.
 National Wildlife Data Center (10 July 2015). "Protected Area Gazette Notification Database (Tamil Nadu)". Wildlife Institute of India. Retrieved 2007-03-26.

External links
 Official website. Retrieved on 27 May 2017.
 Kenneth Anderson Nature Society protects the wildlife conversion in melagiri region and campion for cauvery north wildlife sanctuary. Retrieved on 27 May 2017.
 List of Wildlife Sanctuaries of India had listed sanctuary under S.No 406 by Vijay choudhary. Retrieved on 27 May 2017.
 Melagiris – Secret Jewel Of The Eastern Ghats by N. Lakshminarayanan (10, October 2016). Retrieved on 27 May 2017.

Wildlife sanctuaries in Tamil Nadu
2014 establishments in Tamil Nadu
Protected areas established in 2014